Venkateswaran may refer to 

 A. P. Venkateswaran (1930–2014), Indian diplomat
 G. Venkateswaran (died 2003), Indian film producer
 S. Venkateswaran (1901–1968), Indian civil servant
 Sankar Venkateswaran (born 1979), Indian theatre director

indian  given names